Faith Methodist Church is a Christian church, affiliated with the Trinity Annual Conference (TRAC), under the Methodist Church in Singapore (MCS). It is located at 400 Commonwealth Drive, Singapore 149604 in the island nation of Singapore within walking distance of Commonwealth MRT station. It is 1 of the 45 Methodist churches located in the country. It is currently led by Reverend Raymond Fong, who took over as Pastor-in-Charge (PIC) in 2017, Sep. His team of pastors include Reverend Derrick Lau, Reverend Peter Koh, Reverend See Swee Fang and Pastor Anthony Phua.  An average of about 2200 people come for its Sunday Celebration Services at 400 Commonwealth Drive and at ACJC.

History 
Faith Methodist Church started in 1966 as a Methodist Chapel to serve the residents of Queenstown. Before the church building was completed, worship services were conducted in the open air and later in a temporary shed.

In 1967, the founding pastor of Faith Methodist Church, Rev T.C Nga and his team saw to the completion of the church building, which they share with their sister Chinese Methodist Church. The church was named Faith Methodist Church in honour of God’s faithfulness in the entire project and in memory of Faith Goh, the only daughter of Dr Goh and Mrs Goh Kok Kee, who were gracious donors to the church building fund.

In time, Faith's membership grew and the church facilities were inadequate to meet the needs of the congregation. Hence, the church building was redeveloped from 2002 to 2003.
 
Today, the church building houses a 1000-seat sanctuary, 800-seat worship hall, two levels of parking, as well as a kindergarten, playground, library and a columbarium. The building is also equipped with lifts and ramps to cater to seniors who are mobility-challenged.

From 38 attendees when it first started, Faith’s congregation has grown to some 2,500 today.

Faith has been committed to community service and missions. It has set up Lakeside Family Centre, Jurong Preaching Point (now Agape Methodist Church) and FaithActs community service agency, and is actively involved in international ministry.

Services 

Faith Methodist Church holds a number of Sunday Celebration Services at various timings for different age groups.

Regular Sundays:

Faith Methodist Church @
400 Commonwealth Drive, Singapore 149604

8am	:	Traditional Service

11am      :       Contemporary Service
  
Anglo-Chinese JC (ACJC) @
25 Dover Close East, Singapore 139745

10:00am:	        Mandarin Service (华语主日崇拜)

10.30am:		Contemporary Service  

10.30am:		The TackleBox Youth Service (TTB)
  
Children's programme available at 10.30am in ACJC only. Children's programme at Commonwealth will start in Jan 2018.

External links
 Faith Methodist Church – Official website

Churches in Singapore